Eetu Karvinen (born 27 January 1993) is a Finnish ice hockey forward currently playing for RoKi of the Finnish Mestis.

References

External links
 

1993 births
Living people
Sportspeople from Vantaa
Lukko players
Finnish ice hockey forwards
Cedar Rapids RoughRiders players
Sioux City Musketeers players